The 1975 Tampa Bay Rowdies indoor season was the first indoor season of the club's existence. It also marked the first time the expansion Rowdies participated in any North American Soccer League sanctioned competition.

Original kit
The Rowdies' jersey used during the 1975 indoor season was different than later indoor and outdoor years in that the neckline was merely a cuff rather than the full collar style that became so familiar in all of Tampa Bay's later NASL campaigns. Photographic evidence also indicates that the cuff-style jersey saw limited use during the 1975 outdoor season, but by season's end it disappeared altogether.

Club

Roster

 *amateur player

Management and technical staff
 George Strawbridge, Jr., owner
 Beau Rogers, general manager
 Eddie Firmani, head coach
 Chas Serednesky, business manager
 Francisco Marcos, director of public relations
 Alfredo Beronda, equipment manager

Honors
NASL Indoor Tournament: Runners up
NASL Indoor, Region 3: Regional champions

Individual honors
All-Tournament Team: Doug Wark
Regional MVP: Ringo Cantillo (Regional totals: 2 games, 4 goals)

Review
In part because of the success of the spring 1974 indoor tour by the Red Army team the NASL decided to hold an indoor tournament of its own. Of the 20 franchises in the league, sixteen participated. Teams were separated into four regional groups of four. The Bayfront Center in St. Petersburg, Florida, was chosen as one of the Regional venues, with the Rowdies as hosts for Region 3. The San Jose Earthquakes were given the honor of hosting the championship semifinals and finals at the Cow Palace.

Region 3 tournament
The winner of the Region 3 would gain an automatic place in the Championship tournament four weeks later in California. In their first tournament game the Rowdies had no trouble with the Washington Diplomats, winning by a score of 7–2.
Two nights later Tampa Bay had a tougher task in coming from behind to defeat the Baltimore Comets, 8–6. Those two victories left the Rowdies tied with the Miami Toros in the standings, however the tie-breaker was goal differential. Tampa Bay's plus-7 goal margin narrowly edged out the Toros’ plus-6, and the Rowdies advanced. Ringo Cantillo was named MVP of the Region, edging out Miami's Nico Bodonczy by one vote.

Regional standings

Championship tournament
Tampa Bay was paired up with the New York Cosmos in the semifinals, while the other semifinal had San Jose clashing with the Dallas Tornado. Led by Doug Wark’s record six-goal performance, the Rowdies jumped out to an early 3–0 lead, and never looked back, as they dispatched the Cosmos, 13–5, to advance to the final on Sunday.

On March 16, 1975, the Tampa Bay faced a heavily favored San Jose Earthquakes team in the Rowdies first of what would be many championship finals, against. With the score 6–1 at the end of the first period, and 8,618 fans behind them, San Jose showed exactly why they were tabbed to win the tournament. From there the home team cruised to an 8–5 victory. In addition to the Rowdies’ runner-up performance, Doug Wark was named to the All-Tournament squad and was the second leading scorer in the tournament.

Bracket

Championship standings

Match reports

Statistics

Scoring
GP = Games Played, G = Goals (worth 2 points), A = Assists (worth 1 point), Pts = Points

Goalkeeping
Note: GP = Games played; Min = Minutes played; GA = Goals against; GAA = Goals against average; W = Wins; L = Losses

Player movement
Since Tampa Bay was a newly formed club, the entire roster was new.

In

Out 
none

Loan in

See also
 1975 team indoor stats

References

1975 indoor
Tampa Bay Rowdies (1975–1993) seasons
Tampa Bay Rowdies
Tampa Bay Rowdies
Tampa Bay Rowdies
Tampa Bay Rowdies